The athletics competition at the 1987 Southeast Asian Games was held at the Senayan Stadium, Jakarta, Indonesia

Medal summary

Men

Women

Medal table

References
 https://eresources.nlb.gov.sg/newspapers/Digitised/Article/straitstimes19870916-1.2.46.13.12.aspx
 http://eresources.nlb.gov.sg/newspapers/Digitised/Article/straitstimes19870917-1.2.57.22.4
 http://eresources.nlb.gov.sg/newspapers/Digitised/Article/straitstimes19870921-1.2.55.1
Southeast Asian Games. GBR Athletics. Retrieved 2020-02-08.

1987
Athletics
Southeast Asian Games
1987 Southeast Asian Games